The 2011–12 Colorado State Rams men's basketball team represented Colorado State University during the 2011–12 NCAA Division I men's basketball season. The team was coached by Tim Miles in his 5th season. They played their home games at the Moby Arena on Colorado State University's main campus in Fort Collins, Colorado and are a member of the Mountain West Conference. They finished the season 20–12, 8–6 in Mountain West play to finish in fourth place. They lost in the semifinals of the Mountain West Basketball tournament to San Diego State. They received an at-large bid to the 2012 NCAA basketball tournament where they lost in the second round to Murray State.

Departures
The Colorado State Rams lost senior power forward Andy Ogide who was averaging 17.2 ppg, senior Small Forward Travis Franklin who was averaging 11.8 ppg, Adam Nigon and Andre McFarland.

Roster

Schedule and results 

|-
!colspan=9| Exhibition

|-
!colspan=9| Regular season

|-
!colspan=9| 2012 Mountain West Conference men's basketball tournament

|-
!colspan=9 | 2012 NCAA tournament

See also 
 2011–12 NCAA Division I men's basketball season
 2011–12 NCAA Division I men's basketball rankings

References 

Colorado State
Colorado State Rams men's basketball seasons
Colorado State
Colorado State Rams
Colorado State Rams